Ettlingen Palace is a baroque palace in the centre of Ettlingen, a small city in Baden-Württemberg, Germany.

Predecessor Buildings 
Today's palace succeeds two, possibly three previous buildings. The German Emperor Friedrich II enfeoffed Herman V, Margrave of Baden, with the city of Ettlingen which had been founded by the Staufers. Mid-13th-century, Hermann's son Margrave Rudolf I of Baden built a castle complex in Ettlingen, possibly on the ruins of a previous building of the Staufers. However, so far such a predecessor building could not be verified. The ground floors of the keep in the castle's inner courtyard were built in the 13th century and still exist today.

In the 16th century, a grand renaissance palace succeeded the 13th century castle. Two turrets were added to the southern wing and the keep was given a timbered upper floor. The renaissance palace with its three wings around the old keep was finished in 1600. In 1689, French troops completely destroyed both the palace and the city during the Palatine war of succession.

Baroque palace

Building History 
After her husband, Margrave Ludwig Wilhelm Türkenlouis, died in 1707, Margravine Augusta Sibylla decided to take up widow's residence at Ettlingen.
From 1727 to 1733, she had the remaining ruins rebuilt. Using sandstone from Lossburg, the master builder Johann Michael Ludwig Rohrer built a luxurious baroque palace with four wings. It was to serve as a residence for her later years. After Margravine Augusta Sibylla’s death in 1733, the palace was used for multiple purposes for almost two centuries, including as a guest house and as a military hospital. In 1871, the Prussians turned it into an NCO school before the palace became property of the city of Ettlingen in 1912.

Palace courtyard 
The highlight of the clearly structured palace courtyard is a stunningly beautiful illusionistic baroque painting on the wall towards the south wing. Additionally, there is an impressively constructed doorway and a dolphin fountain from 1612. This magnificent location sets the scene for the Ettlinger Schlossfestspiele, an annual theatre festival in Ettlingen.

Asam hall 
Augusta Sibylla paid particular attention to the construction of the palace chapel which was dedicated to St John Nepomuk. It is decorated with 30 frescos by German baroque painter and architect Cosmas Damian Asam (1686–1739) depicting the martyrdom of St John Nepomuk. They are the only remaining frescos by Cosmas Damian Asam in the Upper Rhine region. Nowadays, the chapel is used as main hall where concerts, such as Schubertiades take place.

Great Hall
Among the most prestigious rooms of the palace is also the Great Hall, which was used as ballroom by Augusta Sibylla. Its window recesses are decorated with mural paintings. Moreover, it features a gently curved gallery and a larger Bohemian chandelier.

Museum
Nowadays, the palace is museum and venue for different kinds of events. It contains a collection concerning local history and archeology, a collection of regional art works since 1900, particularly works by Karl Hofer as well as a paintings gallery. East Asian handicraft is displayed in the baroque state rooms.

References

Further reading 
Anstett, Peter (1975). "Asamsaal im Schloß zu Ettlingen instandgesetzt" (PDF). Denkmalpflege in Baden-Württemberg. 4 (2): 84.

External links 

 Schloss Ettlingen auf Schlösser und Burgen in Baden-Württemberg

Palaces in Baden-Württemberg
Baroque architecture in Baden-Württemberg
Museums in Baden-Württemberg